Teatro Rossini may refer to:

Teatro Rossini, a theatre in Bahía Blanca, Buenos Aires,  Argentina
Teatro Rossini, a theatre in Arequito, Santa Fe Province,  Argentina (Sociedad Italiana, Cine Teatro Rossini)
Teatro Rossini (Lugo), an 18th-century opera house in Lugo, Italy
Teatro Rossini (Pesaro), a 19th-century opera house in Pesaro, Italy
Teatro Rossini, originally called the Teatro San Benedetto, a theatre in Venice, Italy, currently undergoing restoration